Galo may refer to:

People
 Galo Blanco (born 1976), Spanish tennis player
 Galo Chiriboga, Ecuadorian lawyer, politician and administrator
 Galo Galecio (1906–1993), Ecuadorian painter, sculptor, caricaturist and printmaker
 Galo Ocampo (1913–1985), Filipino artist
 Galo René Pérez (1923–2008), Ecuadorian writer, poet, literary critic, biographer and college instructor
 Galo Plaza (1906–1987), President of Ecuador and Secretary General of the Organization of American States
 Galo Vásquez (born 1957), Ecuadorian footballer
 Diego Galo (born 1984), Brazilian footballer
 Evelina Galo, Croatian former handball player
 Igor Galo (born 1948), Serbian and Croatian actor
 João Galo (born 1961), Portuguese footballer
 Mandla Galo (born 1962), South African politician, inaugural president of the African Independent Congress
 Orlando Galo (born 2000), Costa Rican footballer
 Rodrigo Galo (born 1986), Brazilian footballer
 Tomáš Galo (born 1996), Slovak footballer

Other uses
 Galo people of Arunachal Pradesh, India
 Galo language, the Tibeto-Burman language spoken by the Galo people
 Galo, Central African Republic, a village
 Clube Atlético Mineiro, a Brazilian football club nicknamed Galo (Portuguese for "Rooster"), based in Belo Horizonte, Minas Gerais
 Galo Futebol Americano, an American football team based in Belo Horizonte, Minas Gerais, Brazil

See also 
 
 Gallo (disambiguation)
 Galos (disambiguation)

Masculine given names